En Veedu En Kanavar, (also known as Manaiviyai Kaadali before release) is a 1990 Indian Tamil language romantic drama film directed by Senbaga Raman. The film stars Suresh and Nadhiya, while Rajiv and Manorama appeared in other pivotal role. This was the debut for Thala Ajith Kumar who was briefly featured for a song sequence and also Nadhiya's last film before taking a short hiatus from acting.

Cast 
Suresh as Raja
Nadhiya as Radha
Rajiv as Kumar
Manorama
Madhuri
Senthil
S. S. Chandran
Jai Ganesh
Delhi Ganesh
Ajith Kumar as a school boy in the song "En Kanmani"

Production 
The film's production as well as censoring completed in 1988 and its initial title was Manaiviyae Kaathali, but was released only in 1990. Ajith Kumar plays a school boy in the song "En Kanmani", and thus it became his first appearance onscreen.

Soundtrack 

1
Ennenna Asaikattinayo
2:20

2
Kalamam Vellamadile
2:33

3
Kanmaniye
3:15

4
Konjumozhi
2:57

5
Pongalo Pongal
3:05

6
Rama Rama Indithaka
2:49

7
Sollavallayo
3:40

8
Vathabi Ganapathim
2:25

9
Boomiyile Oru
2:39

References

External links 
 

1990 films
1990s Tamil-language films